The 1999 Philippine Basketball Association (PBA) rookie draft was an event at which teams drafted players from the amateur ranks. The draft was held on January 16, 1999 at Glorietta in Makati.

Tanduay's concession
In 1999, Tanduay made its return to the PBA as the league's ninth member. As part of the agreement, the league allowed six players, four of which were rookies, from their PBL lineup to be elevated to the pro league.

Direct hire

Round 1

Round 2

Round 3

References

External links
1999 PBA draft@interbasket.net

Philippine Basketball Association draft
draft